"Round and Around" is a song from Pink Floyd's 1987 album, A Momentary Lapse of Reason. It shares the sixth track with "Yet Another Movie", Index #2 and is a short, repetitive instrumental in 5/8 time.

Later release
It was released as a separate track on the 2011 remastered CD and on the live album Delicate Sound of Thunder.

Personnel
David Gilmour – guitars, sequencer

Additional musicians

Jon Carin – keyboards
Tony Levin – bass guitar

References

1987 songs
1980s instrumentals
Pink Floyd songs
Rock instrumentals
Songs written by David Gilmour
Song recordings produced by David Gilmour